Carpatolechia epomidella is a moth of the family Gelechiidae. It is found in Sweden, Finland, Estonia, Latvia and Russia.

The wingspan is 17–18 mm.

The larvae feed on Ledum palustre.

References

Moths described in 1869
Carpatolechia
Moths of Europe